Alois Morgenstern (born 13 June 1954 in Spittal an der Drau) is an Austrian former alpine skier who competed in the 1976 Winter Olympics.

External links
 sports-reference.com

1954 births
Living people
Austrian male alpine skiers
Olympic alpine skiers of Austria
Alpine skiers at the 1976 Winter Olympics
People from Spittal an der Drau
Sportspeople from Carinthia (state)